Rockcliffe is a civil parish in the Carlisle district of Cumbria, England.  It contains 16 buildings that are recorded in the National Heritage List for England.  Of these, one is listed at Grade I, the highest of the three grades, two are at Grade II*, the middle grade, and the others are at Grade II, the lowest grade.  The parish contains the villages of Rockcliffe and Harker, and the surrounding countryside.  The listed buildings include houses and associated structures, farmhouses and farm buildings, a church with a mediaeval cross in the churchyard, a public house, and a milestone.

Key

Buildings

Citations

Sources

Lists of listed buildings in Cumbria
Listed buildings in